Corny Lake is an 11-acre lake in Cook County, Minnesota which is tributary to the Poplar River.

References

Lakes of Cook County, Minnesota
Lakes of Minnesota
Superior National Forest